Tom Hebl (born November 14, 1945) is an American Democratic politician from Wisconsin.

Born in Madison, Wisconsin, Hebl graduated from University of Wisconsin–Whitewater and received his Juris Doctor degree from John Marshall Law School in Chicago, Illinois. In 1996, Hebl was elected to the Wisconsin State Assembly and served until 2005, when he ran for another elective office. In April 2007, Hebl was elected Wisconsin Municipal Judge for the city of Sun Prairie, Wisconsin.

Notes

Politicians from Madison, Wisconsin
University of Wisconsin–Whitewater alumni
Wisconsin state court judges
Democratic Party members of the Wisconsin State Assembly
1945 births
Living people
21st-century American politicians
Lawyers from Madison, Wisconsin
People from Sun Prairie, Wisconsin